Live in London is a home video of the concert of the English group of crossover classical Il Divo in London Coliseum, of London on 2 August 2011, accompanied by the London Philharmonic Orchestra.
Published on 5 December 2011 in format DVD or Blu-ray.

The concert of 120 minutes exhibits mostly material of the album Wicked Game. 
'Live in London' also has a documentary behind that follows to Seb, Urs, David and Carlos during the recording and promotion of "Wicked Game".

Concert

  
Extra
Countdown to the Coliseum 
At The Classic Brits 
At The Photoshoot 
In The Studio 
At The Coliseum 
Wicked Game – Track By Track 
Wicked Game – Tráiler

Personal

Voice 
 Urs Bühler
 Sébastien Izambard
 Carlos Marín
 David Miller

Certifications

References 

Il Divo albums
2011 video albums